Yadegar-e Olya (also Romanized as Yādegār-e ‘Olyā; also known as Yādegār-e ‘Alī Khvājeh-ye ‘Olyā, ‘Alī Khvājeh, Yādegār-e ‘Alī Khvājeh, and Yādegār-e Bālā) is a village in Zam Rural District, Pain Jam District, Torbat-e Jam County, Razavi Khorasan Province, Iran. At the 2006 census, its population was 398, in 88 families.

References 

Populated places in Torbat-e Jam County